Ras Al Khaimah Medical and Health Sciences University (RAKMHSU) is a medical university in Ras Al Khaimah, United Arab Emirates. The university was established by the Ras Al Khaimah Human Development Foundation (RAK – HDF) under the leadership of Saud bin Saqr al Qasimi, Crown Prince & Deputy Ruler of Ras Al Khaimah and Chancellor of the University. RAK-HDF is a joint venture of the Ras Al Khaimah Government, Al Ghurair Investments and ETA Ascon Group, Dubai.

Colleges

College of Medical Sciences
RAK College of Medical Sciences offers Bachelor of Medicine and Bachelor of Surgery (MBBS) program, consisting of two years of pre-clerkship (integrated, applied basic sciences) courses and three years of clinical clerkship courses. After graduation, one year of Internship is required as per the guidelines of the Ministry of Health and Prevention, UAE to practice Medicine in the UAE.

The curriculum has been developed to provide learning opportunities enabling medical students to acquire fundamental knowledge, develop basic skills and appropriate principles relevant to health care in the context of the community.

The five year curriculum has been designed to follow integrated and problem based approach to medical science. It integrates basic sciences with clinical sciences to enable the students to apply their knowledge to health care and develop a professional and compassionate approach to the analysis and management of health care.

The MBBS program obtained Initial Accreditation from Ministry of Higher Education, UAE in July 2006 and the first academic session commenced in Oct 2006. First Batch graduated in 2011.

College of Dental Sciences
The Bachelor of Dental Surgery (BDS) program is of five years duration followed by one year of internship. The program comprises six months of general education, two years of basic medical and dental sciences and two-and-half years of clinical dental sciences. This is followed by a year of dental internship. The BDS program has obtained Initial Accreditation from Ministry of Higher Education & Scientific Research, UAE and admission is in progress for the academic session commencing September 2009.

College of Pharmaceutical Sciences
Bachelor of Pharmacy (B Pharm), comprises six months of general education, one year of basic sciences, two-and-half years of pharmaceutical sciences and training and 6 months of Practice School. The total program duration is four and half years. B.Pharm program has obtained Initial Accreditation from Ministry of Higher Education and Scientific Research and admissions is in progress for the academic session commencing September 2007.

College of Nursing
College of Nursing offers a Bachelor of Science in Nursing (B.Sc Nursing) of four-year duration. The B.Sc.Nursing program has obtained initial accreditation from the Ministry of Higher Education & Scientific Research, UAE.

References 

Educational institutions established in 2006
Medical schools in the United Arab Emirates
Nursing schools in the United Arab Emirates
Universities and colleges in the Emirate of Ras Al Khaimah
2006 establishments in the United Arab Emirates